Mary Alice Kemery, popularly known as Linda Goodman (April 9, 1925 – October 21, 1995), was a New York Times bestselling American astrologer and poet. She wrote the first astrology book to make the New York Times Best Seller list.

Early life and background
Linda Goodman was born in Morgantown, West Virginia. Although she never revealed her year of birth, swearing even her father to silence, it emerged posthumously that she was born in 1925. According to data collector Frank C. Clifford, Linda was born in Morgantown on April 9, 1925, at 6:05 a.m. Clifford cites Linda's birth certificate as his source. Her father's name was Robert Stratton Kemery; her mother's maiden name was Mazie McBee. By her own account, Goodman was born in her maternal grandparents' house on 115 Kingwood Street. She attended and graduated from Parkersburg High School in 1943 aged 18 years.

Career
Linda Goodman assumed the name 'Linda' during World War II for a popular WCOM radio show in Parkersburg that she hosted called Love Letters from Linda. Each show consisted of her reading letters written between soldiers and their loved ones. Each letter was punctuated with a popular song of the day. While working in radio, she met her second husband, Sam O. Goodman, and took his last name.

She began her career writing for newspapers in the eastern and southeastern United States. She also wrote speeches for black American civil rights leader Whitney Young, who served for several years as president of the National Urban League.

Astrology/writings
Some have suggested that Linda Goodman was responsible for accelerating the growth of the New Age movement through the unprecedented success of her first astrology book Linda Goodman's Sun Signs (1968). This was the first astrology book ever to earn a spot on the New York Times Best Seller list. It was followed by Linda Goodman's Love Signs (1978), which also made the New York Times Best Seller list and set an industry record with $2.3 million being paid for the paperback rights.

Other books by Linda Goodman include:
Venus Trines at Midnight (1970)
Linda Goodman's Love Signs (1978)
Linda Goodman's Love Poems (1980)
Linda Goodman's Star Signs: The Secret Codes of the Universe A Practical Guide for the New Age (1987)
Gooberz (1989)
Linda Goodman's Relationship Signs (1998)

Gooberz, begun in 1967, is a long poem riddled with myriad occult references and symbolism. It is also a thinly veiled autobiography, which explores two of her significant romantic relationships: her marriage to William Snyder and her love affair with marine biologist Robert Brewer. It also touches on the births of her four children: Sally Snyder, Bill Snyder, Jill Goodman and Michael Goodman. The book surveys her ideas on reincarnation, karma, love, and miracles.

Personal life
Goodman was mother to four children: Sally and William (Bill) Snyder from her first marriage, and Jill and Michael Goodman from her second marriage. She also had at least one other child, a daughter who died in infancy.

Daughter
Linda Goodman's books also reference what she referred to as the "disappearance" of her eldest daughter, Sally Snyder, in the 1970s, and the mystery around her reported death. Goodman spent much money and many years trying to find Sally, long after police closed the case as a suicide or accidental suicide. Goodman never accepted the official police report and continued to search for Sally for the rest of her own life. Finally, she believed that her daughter was dead but would return by reincarnation.

Death
Goodman made Cripple Creek, Colorado, her home during the latter part of her life. She first lived in a small Victorian house on Carr Street ("the little crooked house on the crooked little street") and later moved to a newer home on the outskirts of the main town. Both homes still boast her spiritually themed stained-glass windows. The house on Carr Street is now a bed and breakfast. She died in Colorado Springs, Colorado, on October 21, 1995, at the age of 70, from complications of diabetes.

Crystal Bush, a businesswoman from Ireland, befriended Goodman at the end of her life and obtained the publicity rights to the astrologer's name at her death. Bush then published the book Linda Goodman's Relationship Signs.

Notes

References

External links
 "Spiritual pioneer Linda Goodman sought the secrets of life from more than just the stars"
Linda-Goodman.com

1925 births
1995 deaths
20th-century astrologers
American astrologers
American astrological writers
New Age spiritual leaders
American radio personalities
American speechwriters
Deaths from diabetes
New Age writers
Parkersburg High School alumni
Writers from Colorado Springs, Colorado
People from Morgantown, West Virginia
People from Parkersburg, West Virginia
Writers from West Virginia
20th-century American non-fiction writers
20th-century American women writers
People from Cripple Creek, Colorado
American women non-fiction writers
Palmists